Dan Carr (August 24, 1951 – June 26, 2012) was an American poet, type designer, typographer, printer, teacher, punchcutter, environmentalist, human rights activist and New Hampshire State Representative. He co-founded Golgonooza Letter Foundry & Press* (listed among the resources in Elements of Typographic Style), Trois Fontaines,* Four Zoas Night House** and was an editor for the Four Zoas Press, all literary presses.
 *(with co-founder J. Ferrari), ** (with J. Ferrari and M.Olsen)

Typography and punchcutting
He designed four type faces, two for letterpress which he hand cut in the traditional manner: Regulus and Parmenides, and three digital typefaces: Cheneau, Lyons, and Philosophie. Parmenides was commissioned for Robert Bringhurst's book of the same name. Carr received a Maitre Graveur Typographe (Master of Punchcutting) from the Cabinet des Poincons et des Livres, de L’impremerie nationale (Imprimierie Nationale) in Paris, for Regulus in 1998.

Carr's archaic Greek type face called Parmenides was awarded by bukva:raz!, an international competition of type design, sponsored by the Association Typographique Internationale (ATypI). Carr also received an award from the Type Directors Club Type Design Competition for his Cheneau typeface (judging took place at the School of Visual Arts in New York City, in 2000).

Life
Born in Cranston, Rhode Island, August 24, 1951, Carr studied English Literature and received his BA at Clark University in Worcester, Massachusetts. In Boston, Massachusetts, in 1979, he and his partner Julia Ferrari started the Golgonooza Letter Foundry & Press, a hot metal monotype graphic design and composition house, which they moved to Ashuelot, New Hampshire, in 1982. Together they created Trois Fontaines Press in 1997, a limited edition fine press. Carr taught typography, and the history of typography at Keene State University in Keene, New Hampshire, as well as giving workshops on punchcutting and letterpress printing internationally.

Carr became politically active during the Howard Dean campaign of 2004. Carr was elected to the New Hampshire House of Representatives in 2008. In his first term he successfully sponsored legislation to form a NH Commission on Native American Affairs. He served two 2-year terms in the New Hampshire House.

Works

Typefaces
 Regulus (metal) – Maitre Graveur Typographe 1998
 Cheneau (digital) – Judge's Choice ATypI 2000
 Lyons (digital)
 Philosophie (digital)
 Parmenides (metal)  – bukva:raz! 2001

Poetry books
Reach of the Heart – 2008
Gifts of the Leaves – 1997
Intersection – 1989
The Dream Animal – 1988
Mysteries of the Palaces of Water – 1985
The Ennead of Set Heru – 1983
Transmissions of the Mist – 1979
Antedeluvian Dream Songs – 1978
Notice the Star – 1976
Living in Fear – 1975
Li Po’s Sandalwood Boat – 1975

Broadsides

Peace – 2002
Three Seals – 2001
When Grasses Leave No Trace – 1999
Love is Time – 1989
Land of the Double Crown – 1978
The Inlet Waters – 1978

Translations

Shan Zhong Wen Da (In the Mountains) Li Bai. (chapbook) – 2002
Questions and Answers Among the Mountains (broadside display of book design) – 2003

Editorial

The Four Zoas Journal of Poetry and Letters
No. 3 too insane
No. 4 Divine in the void
No. 5 Torture to the Torturers
No. 6 Revolt of the Angels 
No. 7 Still Détente
No. 8 Mythologies

Articles

Making a Visible Spirit: Cutting the Regulus punches – Matrix 16 (1996)
Rewriting History? Observations on the Centenary of The Monotype Recorder – Matrix 18 (1998)
Typographic Sculpture: the Survival of Punchcutting at the Imprimerie Nationale – Matrix 20(2000)
Cutting Parmenides – Matrix 22 (2002)
Casting Chinese Type – Matrix 23 (2003)
The Kuco, a Complete Typecasting and Finishing Machine – Matrix 27 (2007)

References

article: codex3, 2013

article: Parenthesis 25, 2013

1951 births
2012 deaths
American typographers and type designers
Members of the New Hampshire House of Representatives